PSSB stands for Persatuan Sepak bola Seluruh Bireuen (en: Football Association of All Bireuen). PSSB Bireuen is an Indonesian football club based in Bireuën, Bireuën Regency, Aceh. They currently compete in the Liga 3.

Although they competed in 2007–08 Liga Indonesia Premier Division, which was the first-tier Indonesian league at that time, they competed most of the time in second-tier Indonesian league.
In 2014, PSSB failed to pass verification conducted by PSSI in order to compete in Indonesian Premier League, and ever since, they have played in Liga 3, the lowest tier in Indonesian league pyramid. Their home stadium is Cot Gapu Stadium.

References

External links
PSSB Bireuen at Liga-Indonesia.co.id
 

 
Football clubs in Indonesia
Football clubs in Aceh
Association football clubs established in 1970
1970 establishments in Indonesia